Mount Hector is a  mountain summit located in the Bow River valley of Banff National Park, in the Canadian Rockies of Alberta, Canada. The mountain was named in 1884 by George M. Dawson after James Hector, a geologist on the Palliser expedition.

The first ascent was made in 1895 by Philip S. Abbot, Charles Fay and Charles S. Thompson.

Geology
Like other mountains in Banff Park, Mount Hector is composed of sedimentary rock laid down during the Precambrian to Jurassic periods. Formed in shallow seas, this sedimentary rock was pushed east and over the top of younger rock during the Laramide orogeny. The summit down to the base of cliffs is composed of Cathedral limestone and dolostone of the middle Cambrian period while the slopes below are of middle Cambrian Gog Group quartzite.

Climate
Based on the Köppen climate classification, Mount Hector is located in a subarctic climate with cold, snowy winters, and mild summers.

See also
 List of Ultras of North America
 Mountain peaks of Canada
 List of mountain peaks of North America
 List of mountain peaks of the Rocky Mountains
 Rocky Mountains

References

External links 
 "Mount Hector, Alberta" on Peakbagger

Three-thousanders of Alberta
Canadian Rockies
Mountains of Banff National Park